Kuppam Airport (Domestic Airport) is a public airport under construction at Kuppam, in the state of Andhra Pradesh, India. The greenfield airport will be built by the Infrastructure Corporation of Andhra Pradesh Limited (INCAP). The airport is to handle Passengers and cargo operations.

Airport Project Details by APADCL:-

Kuppam Airport Project Details

History 
The regions around Kuppam has a wide horticulture presence with several plantations of flowers, fruits and vegetables. The Chittoor district has also seen an increased industrial activity. To benefit the economy of the area, a cargo airport has been proposed.

In 2015, INCAP conducted a feasibility study for the development of five greenfield airports in the state, including Kuppam. The Central Government of India cleared the proposal for an airstrip at Kuppam on 2 August 2018. The then Chief Minister of Andhra Pradesh, Chandrababu Naidu, laid the foundation stone for the airport project on 3 January 2019. It was originally slated to complete the construction within the next eight months. Construction is expected to Start in the  Year  2023 

References 

Airports in Andhra Pradesh
Proposed airports in Andhra Pradesh
Chittoor district